Mileta Lisica (7 October 1966 – 11 November 2020) was a Serbian-Slovenian professional basketball player.

Playing career 
Lisica had played for the Poliester from Priboj and the Sloboda from Tuzla before he came to the Crvena zvezda. With the Zvezda he won two YUBA League titles (1993 and 1994). He spent one season at the Borovica from Ruma and with them, he reached the YUBA League Playoffs Final in 1995. After that, he returned to the Zvezda and spent another season with them.

In 1996, Lisica went to play for the Pivovarna Laško of the Slovenian Premier League. He played six seasons there and has been one of the team's best players. He participated at three Slovenian League All-Star Games. After leaving Slovenia, he played two seasons in the France LNB Pro A League. He played there for the Le Mans and the Limoges CSP.

In November 2003, he returned to Serbia and played one season for the Lavovi 063 and two seasons for the Novi Sad. Lisica finished his playing career at the Slovenian team Rudar Trbovlje after the 2007–08 season.

Personal life 
In 2002, Lisica got Slovenian citizenship.

He had two sons Rade (born 1997) and Đorđe (born 1999), both became basketball players. Rade played for Vojvodina of the Basketball League of Serbia in 2019. Đorđe played for Zlatorog Laško.

On 11 November 2020, Lisica died after a long and severe illness.

Career achievements and awards

Club 
 Yugoslav League champion: 2 (with Crvena zvezda: 1992–93, 1993–94)
 Yugoslav Super Cup winner: 1 (with Crvena zvezda: 1993)

Individual 
 YUBA League MVP: 1994
 Slovenian League MVP: 2000
 Slovenian League Best Foreign Player: 2000
 Slovenian League All-Star Game: 1999, 2000, 2001

See also 
 KK Crvena zvezda accomplishments and records
 List of KK Crvena zvezda players with 100 games played

References

External links
 Profile at eurobasket.com
 Na današnji dan: Rođen Mileta Lisica

1966 births
2020 deaths
KK Borovica players
KK Crvena zvezda players
KK Lavovi 063 players
KK Novi Sad players
KK Zlatorog Laško players
KK Sloboda Tuzla players
Le Mans Sarthe Basket players
Limoges CSP players
People from Priboj
Serbian men's basketball players
Slovenian men's basketball players
Slovenian people of Serbian descent
Serbian expatriate basketball people in Bosnia and Herzegovina
Serbian expatriate basketball people in Slovenia
Serbian expatriate basketball people in France
Yugoslav men's basketball players
Centers (basketball)
Power forwards (basketball)